This is a list of notable Colombian Americans, including both original immigrants who obtained American citizenship and their American descendants.

To be included in this list, the person must have a Wikipedia article showing they are Colombian American or must have references showing they are Colombian American and are notable.

List

Artists and designers

Esteban Cortázar (1984-) - fashion designer
Miguel Gómez (1974-) - photographer
Guilloume - Colombian minimalist artist, self-described master of "Bolismo"
Greg Giraldo - comedian
René Moncada - Colombian-born American artist 
Lari Pittman - painter
Gala Porras-Kim - conceptual artist
 R. J. Palacio - author and graphic designer
Diego Suarez (1888-1974) - garden designer known for his work at James Deering's Villa Vizcaya in Miami, Florida.

Anchors and TV personalities 
Julie Banderas - Fox News anchor
Monica Fonseca (1982-) - television presenter, journalist and blogger

Ingrid Hoffmann - Colombian-American television personality and restaurateur

Actors 

 Odette Annable - American actress of Colombian, French, and Cuban descent 
 Moisés Arias - American actor
 Yancey Arias - American actor of Colombian and Puerto Rican descent
 Stephanie Beatriz - American actress of Colombian father
 Lillo Brancato - Colombian-born American actor (A Bronx Tale, The Sopranos).
 Héctor Luis Bustamante - Colombian American actor
 Sasha Calle - Colombian American actress
 Sofia Carson - Colombian American Actress known for the movie Descendants
 Natalia Castellanos - actress. She is of Colombian and Venezuelan descent.
 Adriana Cataño - American actress and television host
 Alyssa Diaz - American actress of Colombian and Mexican-American descent
 Paula Garcés - actress
 Isabella Gomez - Colombian-born American actress
 Diane Guerrero - American actress of Colombian descent
 Jack Guzman - Colombian-born American actor, known of the series Power Rangers Wild Force
 Ana Carolina Grajales - American actress of Colombian descent
 Nico Greetham - He is an actor and dancer of Colombian descent. He is best known for participating in So You Think You Can Dance and Power Rangers Ninja Steel.
Zulay Henao - film and television actress
 Thom Adcox-Hernandez - American voice and television actor of Colombian descent (Falcon Crest, The Twisted Tales of Felix the Cat, Gargoyles)
 Andrew Keegan - actor, mother is Colombian.
 John Leguizamo (1964-) - actor and comedian
 Kika Perez - born Ilva Margarita Perez, Colombian-American actress and TV host
 Danny Ramirez (1992-) - American actor of Colombian and Mexican descent
 Carolina Ravassa (1985-) - Colombian-born American actress
 Sonya Smith - American actress best known for her roles in telenovelas. Her mother is Venezuelan and her father is of Colombian partially descent.
 Paola Turbay (1970-) - actress, TV host and beauty queen
 Brittany Underwood - American actress to Colombian mother 
 Wilmer Valderrama - actor. He is of Colombian and Venezuelan descent.
 Carlos Valdes - Colombian-born American actor, Cisco Ramon on the TV series The Flash
 Alexa Vega - American actress from Colombian father
 Makenzie Vega - American actress, young sister of Alexa Vega 
 Sofía Vergara (1972-) - Colombian actress, known for the series Modern Family
 Rachel Zegler - She is of Colombian and Polish descent

Musicians
 Shakira (1977-) - Colombian singer and songwriter.
 Kali Uchis (1994-) - Colombian-American singer and songwriter
 Lil Pump - Florida rapper born to Colombian parents (as stated in an interview with J. Cole)
 Psycho Les - hip hop emcee of the group The Beatnuts
 Adassa - American reggaetón singer-songwriter also known as the "Reggaetón Princess". She was born to Afro-Colombians parents.
 Ryan Cabrera - American singer born to a Colombian father and an American mother
 Jason Castro - singer-songwriter
 Freddy Cricien - American emcee and vocalist for the hardcore band Madball
 Robo (1955-) - drummer (Black Flag, Misfits)
 Kike Santander - Colombian songwriter and producer naturalized in the United States in 2004
 Yasmin Deliz - American singer-songwriter, model and actress of Dominican and Colombian and Venezuelan parentage.
 Carlos Dengler (1974-) - former bassist of the band Interpol
 Santiago Durango - guitarist (Big Black, Naked Raygun) 
 Alex González (musician) (1969-) - American-born musician of Cuban and Colombian origin.
 Danny Mercer - Colombian American recording artist, songwriter, and producer
 Ericson Alexander Molano - Gospel Christian singer
 Erick Morillo - Colombian-American DJ, music producer and record label owner
 Billy Murcia - drummer (New York Dolls).
 Marty Stuart - American country music singer-songwriter. He is of French, English, Choctaw, and Colombian descent.
 Tonedeff - American rapper, producer, and singer-songwriter. He was born to a Cuban mother and a Colombian father.
 Andrés Useche - Colombian American writer, film director, graphic artist, singer-songwriter and activist.
 DJ Yonny - American DJ, producer and remixer. 
Rob Swift - (born Robert Aguilar) American hip hop DJ and turntablist group The X-Ecutioners as of late 2005 and as of 2006; with Mike Patton's project Peeping Tom. Rob Swift is on the faculty of Scratch DJ Academy in New York City.
 Soraya (1969-2006) - Colombian-American songwriter, guitarist, arranger and record producer.

Sports
Roberto Guerrero (1958-) - Formula One racecar driver
Juan Pablo Montoya (1975-) - Formula One, Indy and Cart racecar driver
Juan Agudelo - soccer player 
Kiko Alonso - NFL player
Alejandro Bedoya - American soccer player 
Daniel Barrera - American professional soccer player 
Lou Castro - first Latin American born player to play in Major League Baseball in the United States, and the first Latin American since player Esteban Bellán in 1873 as a professional baseball player. 
Diego Corrales (1977-2007) - world champion boxer, father is Colombian and mother is Mexican
Scott Gomez - retired NHL player. Half Colombian and half Mexican.
Diego Gutiérrez (soccer) - retired Colombian American footballer 
Eliot Halverson - American figure skater
George Hincapie - cyclist
Carlos Llamosa - soccer player 
Oscar Mercado - MLB player
Travis Pastrana - American motorsports competitor and stunt performer who has won championships and X Games gold medals in several events
Fuad Reveiz (1963-) - former NFL player
Johnny Torres - Colombian-American soccer midfielder and coach
Fernando Velasco - former NFL player

Models
Manuela Arbeláez - model (The Price Is Right).
 Maria Checa - Colombian-American model and actress.

Journalists 
Nina García (1965-) - fashion journalist and critic (Project Runway, Elle, Marie Claire). 
Omar Jimenez - journalist and correspondent for CNN
Adrian Lamo - hacker and journalist.
Manuel Teodoro (1960-) - journalist (CBS News, Univision) (also has Filipino descent).

Politicians 
 Diana Farrell - member and one of two deputy directors of the United States National Economic Council (NEC) in the administration of President Barack Obama.
 Jeff Frederick - former member of the General Assembly of Virginia.
 Ruben Gallego - U.S. Representative for Arizona's 7th congressional district 
 José Sarria - first openly gay candidate for public office in the United States
 Lina Hidalgo - county judge for Harris County, Texas
 Scott Perry (politician) - U.S. Representative for Pennsylvania's 10th congressional district

Writers 
 James Cañón - Colombian author
 Mo Rocca - American writer, journalist, comedian and political satirist to Colombian (mother) and Italian (father) descent.
 Andrés Useche - Colombian American naturalized writer, film director, graphic artist and singer/songwriter
 Jaime Manrique - Colombian American novelist, poet, essayist, educator, and translator.
 R. J. Palacio - Mexican-born American author to Colombian parents.

Scientists
Jaime Imitola - neuroimmunologist
Juan B. Gutierrez - mathematician and author
Rodolfo Llinás (1934-) - neuroscientist
Guillermo Owen - mathematician 
Ana María Rey - physicist

Others 
 Medaria Arradondo, Minneapolis police chief
 Andrés Felipe Cabrera, Colombian-American Make-up artist 
 José Luis Castillo (activist) - Colombian-American activist, politician, and non-profit community liaison in south Florida. He was born to a Dutch mother and a Colombian father in Netherlands. He lives in Florida.
 Arturo Escobar - Colombian-American anthropologist primarily known for his contribution to postdevelopment theory and political ecology
Carlos Goez (1939-1990) - founder of the original Pomander Book Shop in New York
Will Jimeno - police officer, 9/11 survivor, portrayed in World Trade Center
 Andre Melendez (1971-1996) - better known as Angel Melendez, was a Club Kid and drug dealer who lived and worked in New York City
 Beto Pérez - Colombian born American dancer and choreographer who created the fitness program Zumba in the 1990s
Cristina Pérez - judge
 Julio Mario Santo Domingo (1923-2011) - Colombian billionaire
 Alejandro Santo Domingo (1977-) - Colombian American financier
 Al Williamson (1931-2010) - American cartoonist, comic book artist and illustrator specializing in adventure, Western and science-fiction/fantasy.
George Zamka - NASA astronaut
Laura DePuy (1971-) - Colombian-American colorist who has produced work for several of the major comics companies, including DC Comics, Marvel Comics and CrossGen.
Carlos Garzón (1945-) - Colombian cartoonist, who has lived in the United States since the mid-70s, where he has worked for publishers such as Marvel or DC.
Antonio Negret - Colombian director on Netflix's Chilling Adventures of Sabrina , The CW's Riverdale and others.

References

Colombian Americans

Americans
Colombian Americans
Colombian